Confirmation is an album by pianist Tommy Flanagan compiling unreleased tracks recorded in 1977 and 1978 at sessions that produced Eclypso and Ballads & Blues which was released on the Enja label in 1982.

Reception

AllMusic awarded the album 3 stars.

Track listing
 "Maybe September" (Ray Evans, Percy Faith, Jay Livingston) – 4:54
 "Confirmation" [alternate take] (Charlie Parker) – 6:48
 "How High the Moon" (Morgan Lewis, Nancy Hamilton) – 6:00
 "It Never Entered My Mind" (Richard Rodgers, Lorenz Hart) – 7:05
 "Cup Bearers" [alternate take] (Tom McIntosh) – 4:05
 "50-21" (Thad Jones) – 6:48 
Recorded at Sound Ideas Studios, NYC on February 4, 1977 (tracks 1, 2, 5 & 6) and Penthouse Studio, NYC on November 15, 1978 (tracks 3 & 4)

Personnel 
Tommy Flanagan – piano
George Mraz – bass
Elvin Jones – drums (tracks 1, 2, 5 & 6)

References 

1982 albums
Tommy Flanagan albums
Enja Records albums